Raiamas levequei is a species of ray-finned fish in the genus Raiamas which is found in Guinea.

References 

Raiamas
Fish described in 1989